Eleven vessels, and one planned, of the British Royal Navy have been named HMS Gloucester, after Gloucester, the city in England.

  (also Glocester) was a 54-gun ship launched in 1654 and wrecked in 1682 off Great Yarmouth.
  was a 60-gun fourth rate launched in 1695, on harbour service after 1706, and broken up in 1731.
  was a 60-gun fourth rate launched in July 1709 and captured by the French in October of the same year.
  was a 50-gun fourth rate in service from 1711 to 1724.
  was a 50-gun fourth rate launched in 1737 and burned in 1742 to forestall capture.
  was a 50-gun fourth rate in service from 1745 to 1764.
  was a 74-gun third rate launched in 1812 and sold 1884.
  was a  light cruiser in service from 1909 to 1921.
  was a  cruiser launched in 1937 and sunk off Crete in 1941.  The wreck site is a protected place under the Protection of Military Remains Act.
 HMS Gloucester was intended as a Type 61 frigate, and was ordered from Portsmouth Dockyard in 1956 but later cancelled.
  was a Type 42 destroyer launched in 1982, commissioned in September 1985, and retired from service on 30 June 2011.

Additionally, a 10-gun brig named  was launched on Lake Erie in 1807, captured by the Americans in April 1813 and destroyed by the British a few weeks later.

Battle honours

Lowestoft 1665
Four Days' Battle 1666
Orfordness 1666
Sole Bay 1672
Schooneveld 1673
Battle of Texel 1673
Marbella 1705
Ushant 1747
Jutland 1916
Calabria 1940
Matapan 1941
Crete 1941
Malta Convoys 1941
Mediterranean 1941
Kuwait 1991

Royal Navy ship names